The 2014 Erste Bank Open was a men's tennis tournament played on indoor hard courts. It was the 40th edition of the event known that year as the Erste Bank Open, and part of the ATP World Tour 250 Series of the 2014 ATP World Tour. It was held at the Wiener Stadthalle in Vienna, Austria, from 13 October through 19 October 2014. Second-seeded Andy Murray won the singles title.

Singles main-draw entrants

Seeds

 Rankings are as of October 6, 2014

Other entrants
The following players received wildcards into the singles main draw:
  David Ferrer
  Gerald Melzer
  Andy Murray

The following players received entry from the qualifying draw:
  Daniel Brands
  Victor Hănescu
  Miloslav Mečíř Jr.
  Viktor Troicki

The following player received entry as a lucky loser:
  Norbert Gomboš

Withdrawals
Before the tournament
  David Goffin
  Marcel Granollers
  Jerzy Janowicz
  Martin Kližan
  Gilles Müller (abdominal muscle strain)
  Radek Štěpánek

Doubles main-draw entrants

Seeds

 Rankings are as of October 6, 2014

Other entrants
The following pairs received wildcards into the doubles main draw:
  Jürgen Melzer /  Philipp Petzschner
  Dominic Thiem /  Alexander Zverev
The following pair received entry as alternates:
  Federico Delbonis /  Sergiy Stakhovsky

Withdrawals
Before the tournament
  Martin Kližan

Finals

Singles

  Andy Murray defeated  David Ferrer, 5–7, 6–2, 7–5

Doubles

  Jürgen Melzer /  Philipp Petzschner defeated  Andre Begemann /  Julian Knowle, 7–6(8-6), 4–6, [10–7]

References

External links
 
 ATP tournament profile

Erste Bank Open
Vienna Open
Erste Bank Open